De Ijazat is a Pakistani drama serial that aired on Hum TV from 8 January 2018 to 15 May 2018. The drama stars Zarnish Khan and Mikaal Zulfiqar in lead roles. The show aired Monday and Tuesday evenings on HUM.

Cast
 Mikaal Zulfiqar as Shavez
 Zarnish Khan as Dua
 Ammara Butt as Soha
 Agha Mustafa Hassan as Faizan "faizi"
 Ayesha Sana as Salma
 Irfan Khoosat as Dua's father
 Ayesha Khan as Dua's mother
 Maryam Noor as Nida
 Munazzah Arif as Dua's aunt
 Sabeena Farooq as Zoha
 Aliha Chaudry as Aliha
 Ramiz Siddiqui as Shayen
 Omair Rana

Plot
The drama is about two families; a  middle-class family and a wealthy upper-class family. Dua works as a news reporter to support her not-supportive family. She marries into the wealthy family, and struggles to adjust with her in-laws.

References

External links 
 Official Website

Pakistani drama television series
2018 Pakistani television series debuts
2018 Pakistani television series endings
Urdu-language television shows
Hum TV original programming
Hum TV